Heaven Sent may refer to:

Film and television
 Heaven Sent (film) (Un drôle de paroissien), a 1963 French comedy directed by Jean-Pierre Mocky
 Heaven Sent (1979 film), a Japanese film starring Tsunehiko Watase
 Heaven Sent (1994 film), a film featuring Mary Elizabeth McDonough
 "Heaven Sent" (Doctor Who), an episode of the ninth series of Doctor Who
 Heavent Sent (2015 film), a film directed by Gary Entin

Music

Albums
 Heaven Sent (Half Japanese album) or the title song, 1997
 Heaven Sent (John Paul Young album) or the title song, 1979
 Heaven Sent (Scorpion Wind album), 1996
 Heaven Sent, by Dreamworld, 1996
 Heaven Sent, by Maggie Reilly, 2013
 Heaven Sent, by Rita, 2015

Songs
 "Heaven Sent" (Esthero song), 1998
 "Heaven Sent" (INXS song), 1992
 "Heaven Sent" (Keyshia Cole song), 2008
 "Heaven Sent" (Paul Haig song), 1983
 "Heavensent", by Killing Heidi, 2001
 "Heaven Sent", by Bryan White from How Lucky I Am
 "Heaven Sent", by Dokken from Back for the Attack
 "Heaven Sent", by Hinder from Take It to the Limit

See also
 Heaven Scent, a 1956 cartoon short featuring the character Pepé Le Pew